Come Dance with Me is an American reality competition television series that premiered on CBS on April 15, 2022. The show pairs young dancers with a family member that has supported their training, and the pair perform a dance together for a panel of judges before the determining who continues to the next round. The show was created by LL Cool J, Chris O'Donnell, and Reinout Oerlemans.

History
Come Dance with Me began as a pitch by Reinout Oerlemans for a new family-based dance competition show. Chris O'Donnell was friends with Oerlemans, and he was reading about the pitch while on set working NCIS: Los Angeles. O'Donnell's co-star LL Cool J caught wind of it and expressed interest himself. The two decided that they would help create the show together.

Show format
Talented young dancers team up with an untrained adult family member who has encouraged their dance training. Each week, the pairs learn a dance routine from various dance styles and perform it for a panel of judges. The two lowest-scoring teams then perform a freestyle dance-off to determine which team is eliminated.

Judges and hosts
For the first season, songwriter Philip Lawrence signed on to host the show. Jenna Dewan was the first judge to join the show bringing her experience as a dancer with Janet Jackson and hosting World of Dance. She was joined on the judges panel by plus-size model Dexter Mayfield and Tricia Miranda, a hip hop choreographer.

Contestants

Scoring charts

 indicate the lowest score for each week
 indicate the highest score for each week
 the couple eliminated that week
 the returning couple that was in the bottom two, or three
 the couple withdrew from the competition
 the couple did not perform
 the winning couple
 the runner-up couple
 the third-place couple

Average score chart
This table only counts dances scored on a 30-point scale.

Highest and lowest weekly scores
The best and worst performances in each dance according to the judges' 30-point scale are as follows:

Couples' highest and lowest weekly scores
Scores are based upon a potential 30-point maximum.

Weeks
Individual judges' scores in the charts below (given in parentheses) are listed in this order from left to right: Tricia Miranda, Jenna Dewan, Dexter Mayfield.

Week 1: First Dances
Due to Albert's foot injury, he and Maceo had to withdraw from the competition. Maceo performed the dance routine during the live show with his choreographer Gabe De Guzman as a stand-in. There was no additional elimination.
Running order

Week 2: Pop Night
Running order

Judges' votes to save
Mayfield: Connor & Nadya
Miranda: Lucas & Carolina
Dewan: Connor & Nadya

Week 3: Bust a Groove Night
Running order (Part 1)

Running order (Part 2)

Judges' votes to save
Mayfield: Connor & Nadya
Miranda: Connor & Nadya
Dewan: Connor & Nadya

Week 4: Picture This
Running order

Judges' votes to save
Miranda: Avery & Jack
Mayfield: Saeda & Shamus
Dewan: Avery & Jack

Week 5: #Throwback
Running order

Judges' votes to save
Mayfield: Kennedy & Justin
Miranda: Emelyn & Nicole
Dewan: Kennedy & Justin

Week 6: Musical Magic
Jenna Dewan, along with choreographer Robert Roldan, did a dance to "Falling Slowly" by her fiancé Steve Kazee.
Running order

Judges' votes to save
Dewan: Emily & Anna
Miranda: Emily & Anna
Mayfield: Emily & Anna

Week 7: Jet-Setters
Running order

Judges' votes to save
Mayfield: Kamryn & Adriana
Miranda: Kamryn & Adriana
Dewan: Kamryn & Adriana

Week 8: Heroes Night
The contestants and choreographers did an opening dance to "The Business" by Tiësto.
Running order

Judges' votes to save from the Showout
Dewan: Avery & Jack
Mayfield: Kamryn & Adriana
Miranda: Avery & Jack

Judges' votes to save
Mayfield: Kamryn & Adriana
Miranda: Kennedy & Justin
Dewan: Kennedy & Justin

Week 9: Semi-Final (Family Faves)
The second dances were scored at the end of the show. The judges' separate scores from the second dances were not shown.
Running order

Week 10: Grand Finale
The finalists, judges and choreographers did an opening dance to "Levitating" by Dua Lipa feat. DaBaby.

The second dances were scored at the end of the show. The judges' separate scores from the second dances were not shown.
Running order

Episodes

Reception
Reviewing the show for Decider, Joe Keller found the show entertaining but thought the main improvement might have been a smaller number of contestants to streamline the show. He also praised the overall diversity of the contestants, but pointed out a lack of LGBT representation. Overall, Keller recommended the show, saying that it will "melt your heart."  It also received a 4/5 rating from Common Sense Media where Melissa Camacho said it "sends a beautiful message about the fact that dancing is for everyone, regardless of gender, body type, or natural talent."

International versions
A Belgian version of the show started airing a few weeks before the start of the American version. The first season premiered on Play4 on April 4, 2022, and was hosted by Dutch rapper Gers Pardoel and TikTok star Julie Vermeire.

References

External links

2020s American reality television series
2022 American television series debuts
CBS original programming
Dance competition television shows
English-language television shows
Television series by CBS Studios